The Lawrence Durrell Collection is a special collection of books and periodicals by, about or associated with the novelist and poet Lawrence Durrell, donated to the British Library by Alan G. Thomas.

External links

 BL page

Archives in the London Borough of Camden
Literature of England
British Library collections
Lawrence Durrell